Fossegrenda is a neighborhood in the city of Trondheim in Trøndelag county, Norway. It is located about 5 km south of the city center. It is surrounded by the Nidelva to the southwest, by the districts of Nidarvoll, Bratsbergveien to the northeast, and by the district of Leira to the southeast. Fossengrenda, in English "the waterfall hamlet", was named so because of its proximity to the hydroelectric power station Leirfossene in the Nidelva.

The neighborhood developed as an industrial area from 1975, and remains today an important industrial and business center of the city of Trondheim. A geology laboratory is also conducting research at Fossengrenda.

Nevertheless, Fossegrenda remains a residential area with individual houses and several apartment blocks. 63% of the dwellings are individual houses. Fossegrenda is part of the district of Lerkendal.

References

External links 
 Companies in Fossegrenda 

Neighbourhoods of Trondheim